Grange of Nilteen is a civil parish in County Antrim, Northern Ireland. It is situated in the historic barony of Antrim Upper. It is 3.5 miles east of Antrim on the Six Mile Water River.

Civil parish of Grange of Nilteen
The civil parish includes the hamlet of Dunadry.

Townlands
The civil parish contains the following townlands:
Ballybentragh, Donegore, Dunadry, Islandreagh, Loughermore, Moyadam, Rathbeg and Rathmore.

See also 
List of civil parishes of County Antrim

References